The Southeastern Conference Men's Basketball Player of the Year is an award given to the player who has proven himself, throughout the season, to be the most exceptional talent in the Southeastern Conference (SEC). The school with the most SEC Player of the Year award winners is Kentucky, with 18 total awards. The only current SEC members that have never had a winner are Missouri and Texas A&M, the conference's two newest members (both joining in 2012).

Three different organizations have given this award: United Press International (1965–1992), Associated Press (1965–present), and the SEC coaches (1987–present).

Key

Winners

Winners by school

Footnotes
If no special demarcation indicates which award the player won that season, then he had earned all of the awards available for that year.
Chris Jackson changed his name to Mahmoud Abdul-Rauf in 1991 after converting to Islam.
In 1976–77, two Tennessee players were chosen as the SEC Player of the Year—Ernie Grunfeld and Bernard King were selected by the Associated Press, and Grunfeld was also chosen by United Press International. Both players are counted in the total Player of the Year Award per school tally.

References

Awards established in 1965
NCAA Division I men's basketball conference players of the year
Player